Sina may be 

Tatuyo language 
Shina language 
a dialect of Kamwe language